The Del Norte Formation is a geologic formation in Mexico, New Mexico and Texas near the city of El Paso. It preserves fossils dating back to the early Cretaceous period.

Description
The formation is divided into two informal members. The lower member is mostly calcareous shale with some interbedded fine sandstone and nodular limestone, while the upper member is fossiliferous medium-gray limestone interbedded with tan shale. The formation lies conformably on the Finlay Limestone and is conformably overlain by the Smeltertown Formation. The base of the formation is a prominent  ferruginous sandstone bed that is in sharp contact with the limy mudstone of the underlying Finlay Limestone.

Fossils
The formation contains fossils characteristic of the Albian age. These include bivalves such as grapheids, exogyrids, pectens, and oysters; gastropods; spatangoid echinoderms; ammonoids; corals; sponges; and serpulid worms. Small fossils include dasycladacean algae, ostracods, foraminiferans, echinoderms, and serpulids. Ammonites are present that are characteristic of the Albian.

History of investigation
The formation was first defined by W.S. Strain in 1976, who named it after the Rio Bravo del Norte (Rio Grande).

See also

 List of fossiliferous stratigraphic units in New Mexico
 Paleontology in New Mexico

Footnotes

References
  
 

Limestone formations of the United States
Cretaceous formations of New Mexico